The Wentworth is a historic grand resort hotel in New Castle, New Hampshire, United States. It is managed by Ocean Properties as "Wentworth by the Sea, A Marriott Hotel & Spa". It is one of a handful of the state's surviving Gilded Age grand hotels, and the last located on the seacoast.

Wentworth by the Sea is a member of Historic Hotels of America, the official program of the National Trust for Historic Preservation.

History

The Wentworth was built in 1874 by Daniel Chase, a distiller from Somerville, Massachusetts, and for the first two years was named Wentworth Hall. It was bought by Frank Jones in 1879 and expanded in the Second Empire style. With Jones's death, the hotel was sold in 1902.

In 1905, the hotel housed the Russian and Japanese delegations who concluded the Treaty of Portsmouth to end the Russo-Japanese War. U.S. President Theodore Roosevelt suggested the peace talks, and won the Nobel Peace Prize for his actions. Both delegations were welcomed at no charge, with Frank Jones' executor Judge Calvin Page providing hospitality as Jones' will stipulated he should. The final document was signed at the Portsmouth Naval Shipyard where formal negotiations took place, but the final language of the treaty was drafted, and the armistice ending the fighting, was signed at The Wentworth. In addition, the Japanese hosted an "International Love Fest" at the hotel on the signing.

After a number of owners, Harry Beckwith bought the hotel in 1920 and ran it for 25 years. In 1946, it was acquired by Margaret and James Barker Smith for $200,000. On July 4, 1964, Emerson and Jane Reed became the first African-Americans to overcome the hotel's segregation policy, dining at its restaurant.

With declining fortunes and changing owners, the hotel closed in 1982. A local group, Friends of the Wentworth, formed and tried to preserve the hotel. When they were unable to locate sufficient support, Alan Green, president of the Green Corporation (which owned the hotel at that time), announced its planned demolition in 1995. Attention was drawn to the plight of the Victorian hotel when it appeared on the National Trust for Historic Preservation's (NTHP) list of America's Most Endangered Places, and the History Channel's America's Most Endangered the following year. This postponed the demolition sufficiently to identify a buyer, and Ocean Properties, a Portsmouth-based hotel management company, acquired the property in 1997. The hotel was subsequently renovated, reopened in 2003, and is operated by Ocean Properties as a Marriott resort. The Wentworth by the Sea is a member of the National Trust for Historic Preservation's Historic Hotels of America.

The now-independent Wentworth by the Sea Country Club is home to the golf course that was initially designed by George Wright in 1897, enlarged by Donald Ross in 1921, and further expanded to 18 holes by Geoffrey Cornish in 1964. The Wentworth Marina is also independently operated and welcomes Wentworth hotel guests.

While the hotel was vacant and forlorn, it was used as a haunted setting for the 1999 film, In Dreams, starring Robert Downey, Jr. and Annette Bening.

References

Further reading 
 Dennis Robinson, Wentworth by the Sea. The Life and Times of a Grand Hotel. Publisher: Peter E. Randall (April 1, 2004), .
 Sue Chapman Melanson: Wentworth-By-the-Sea, 1969: A Novel. Publisher: Xlibris (Dec. 10, 2000), .

External links
 Official website
 Wentworth by the Sea Country Club
 Friends of the Wentworth, Inc.
 Wentworth by the Sea Stories, accessed 09-04-2008
 Portsmouth Peace Treaty: 1905-2005

Hotels in New Hampshire
Hotel buildings completed in 1874
Buildings and structures in Rockingham County, New Hampshire
Marriott hotels
Golf clubs and courses in New Hampshire
Golf clubs and courses designed by Donald Ross
Tourist attractions in Rockingham County, New Hampshire
New Castle, New Hampshire
1874 establishments in New Hampshire
Historic Hotels of America